
Year 419 BC was a year of the pre-Julian Roman calendar. At the time, it was known as the Year of the Tribunate of Lanatus, Rutilus, Tricipitinus and Axilla (or, less frequently, year 335 Ab urbe condita). The denomination 419 BC for this year has been used since the early medieval period, when the Anno Domini calendar era became the prevalent method in Europe for naming years.

Events 
 By place 
 Greece 
 Despite the Peace of Nicias still being in effect, Sparta's King Agis II gathers a strong army at Philus and descends upon Argos by marching at night from the north. His allied Boeotian forces fail him, but he is able to conclude a treaty with Argos.

 By topic 
 Drama 
 Euripides' play Andromache is performed.
 Sophocles' play Electra is performed. The play takes its theme from The Libation Bearers by Aeschylus.

Births

Deaths

References